The 1963 Speedorama 200 was a NASCAR Grand National Series event that was held on July 7, 1963, at Rambi Raceway in Myrtle Beach, South Carolina.

Chuck Huckabee's NASCAR Cup debut nets him his lone top-10 finish in ninth place. He wouldn't finish higher than 12th in any of his other 11 Cup starts.

Race report
The entire race lasted one hour and thirty-eight seconds with four thousand people watching Ned Jarrett defeat Buck Baker by more than seven laps. This was the first race competed in by J. D. McDuffie (who drove in a self-sponsored 1961 Ford Galaxie).

The transition to purpose-built racecars began in the early 1960s and occurred gradually over that decade.  Changes made to the sport by the late 1960s brought an end to the "strictly stock" vehicles of the 1950s.

There were no records kept of any cautions committed in this race. Despite McDuffie's later problems, he would finish in 12th place in this race. Bobby Isaac would lead 30 laps before an engine problem would force him to finish in last place. Cale Yarborough would receive his first top-5 finish of his career at this race.

Notable crew chiefs at this race were Herman Beam and Crawford Clements.

The winner would receive $1,000 in winnings ($ in current US dollars) while the last-place finisher would receive a meager $100 for his "hard work" ($ in current US dollars). The total winnings of the race would add up to $4,540 ($ in current US dollars).

Qualifying

Timeline
Section reference:
 Start of race: Bobby Isaac quickly took over the lead from pole position winner Richard Petty.
 Lap 30: Bobby Isaac's vehicle had an engine failure, forcing him out of the race.
 Lap 31: Richard Petty took back the lead from Bobby Isaac.
 Lap 46: Wendell Scott's engine became problematic, causing him to leave the race.
 Lap 60: Richard Petty was involved in a terminal crash, ending his weekend on the track.
 Lap 61: Ned Jarrett took over the lead from Richard Petty.
 Lap 94: Lee Reitzel had his vehicle's engine become problematic, ending his day on the track.
 Lap 119: Jimmy Pardue became the final DNF of the day due to engine problems.
 Finish: Ned Jarrett won the race

Finishing order
Section reference:

 Ned Jarrett (No. 11)
 Buck Baker (No. 87)
 Joe Weatherly (No. 2)
 Neil Castles (No. 86)
 Cale Yarborough (No. 19)
 Larry Manning (No. 09)
 Jimmy Massey (No. 96)
 Curtis Crider (No. 88)
 Chuck Huckabee (No. 62)
 Stick Elliott (No. 18)
 Jimmy Pardue* (No. 54)
 J. D. McDuffie (No. X)
 Ed Livingston (No. 68)
 Lee Reitzel* (No. 93)
 Richard Petty* (No. 41)
 Wendell Scott* (No. 34)
 Mark Hurley* (No. 61)
 Bobby Isaac* (No. 99)

* DNF

References

Speedorama 200
Speedorama 200
NASCAR races at Myrtle Beach Speedway